The Bornean peacock-pheasant (Polyplectron schleiermacheri) is a medium-sized pheasant. It is probably the rarest and certainly the least known of all peacock-pheasants. This elusive bird is endemic to lowland forests of Borneo.

Description
The pheasant is up to 50 cm long, rufous brown and black spotted, with an elongated crest and nape feathers, black below and bare red skin around bluish iris eye. The breast sides are metallic blue-green, bordering the white throat and central upper breast. Its twenty-two tail feathers are decorated with large blue-green ocelli, which may be spread fan-like in display. The female is smaller and duller brown than the male. It has a brown iris and no spurs on its feet.

Taxonomy
Together with the phenotypically similar Malayan peacock-pheasant  and Palawan peacock-pheasant it represents a basal group in its genus; their radiation probably took place during the Pliocene
Being very poorly known, the Bornean peacock-pheasant was long considered to be a subspecies of the Malayan peacock-pheasant, but the two species are well-isolated geographically. The highly specialised anterior breast and upper neck plumage of male Bornean peacock-pheasant males are quite distinctive. Females of the two species are more difficult to distinguish. The rectrices of the Bornean species are morphologically and patterned intermediate between Palawan and Malayan peacock-pheasants.

Status and conservation
Because of ongoing habitat loss, small population size, and limited range, the Bornean peacock-pheasant is evaluated as Endangered on the IUCN Red List of Threatened Species. It is listed on Appendix II of CITES.

References

External links 

 BirdLife Species Factsheet
 Red Data Book
 gbwf.org – Bornean Peacock-Pheasant (Polyplectron schleiermacheri)

Polyplectron
Endemic birds of Borneo
Birds described in 1877